Strongylion, a Greek sculptor, the author of a bronze figure of a horse set up on the Acropolis of Athens late in the 5th century BC, which represented the wooden horse of Troy with the Greek heroes inside it and looking forth. The inscribed base of this statue has been found.

Other works of the sculptor were a figure of Artemis at Megara, a group of the Muses, a statuette of a boy of which Brutus was very fond of, and an Amazon which was greatly admired by the emperor Nero.

References

5th-century BC births
Year of death unknown
5th-century BC Greek sculptors
Ancient Greek sculptors
Ancient Athenian sculptors